Asami Yoshida (吉田 亜沙美 born October 9, 1987) is a Japanese professional basketball player for the JX-Eneos Sunflowers of the Women's Japan Basketball League (WJBL).

Career

WJBL
Yoshida has played for the JX-Eneos Sunflowers, a team based in Kashiwa, since their 2006–07 season where she made her professional debut. In her opening season, she led the Sunflowers to a championship as well as taking home Rookie of the Year. She has enjoyed much success in this league and has led the Sunflowers to another eight championship titles. She has won the league Most Valuable Player award on two occasions, as well as being named to the Best 5, four times.

National Team
Yoshida has been a consistent member of the Japanese national team since 2007. Since then, the Japanese team has medalled at each FIBA Asia Championship. She was named to the FIBA Asia All-Tournament Team in 2013 and 2015, also winning the Championship on both occasions. She made her Olympic debut at the 2016 Summer Olympics in Rio de Janeiro, Brazil.

References

1987 births
Living people
Japanese women's basketball players
Guards (basketball)
Basketball players at the 2016 Summer Olympics
Olympic basketball players of Japan
Basketball players from Tokyo
Asian Games medalists in basketball
Basketball players at the 2006 Asian Games
Basketball players at the 2010 Asian Games
Asian Games bronze medalists for Japan
Medalists at the 2006 Asian Games
Medalists at the 2010 Asian Games